Herbst is an unincorporated census-designated place in Franklin Township, Grant County, Indiana, in the United States. As of the 2010 census, the population was 112.

History
A post office was established at Herbst in 1880, and remained in operation until it was discontinued in 1962. August H. Herbst served as the first postmaster.

Geography

Demographics

References

Census-designated places in Grant County, Indiana
Census-designated places in Indiana